Craig Hampson (born 25 October 1990) is an English rugby union player who plays for Ealing Trailfinders in the RFU Championship.

He was impressed during the 2013/14 campaign with Yorkshire Carnegie and subsequently named in their RFU Championship Dream Team XV. He signed for Championship rivals Bristol from the 2014/15 season.

On 6 January 2016, Hampson joined up with Aviva Premiership side Wasps on a loan deal from Bristol in January 2016 after Joe Simpson was ruled out for an extended period. Hampson made his debut for Wasps coming off the bench against Newcastle Falcons at Kingston Park of the Premiership and his impressive performances in matches and training saw him rewarded with a permanent deal. Hampson first full season at Wasps saw him make several more appearances and was instrumental in helping the A League side reach the semi finals.

On 9 April 2019, Hampson makes his return to the RFU Championship with Ealing Trailfinders from the 2019-20 season.

References

External links
Wasps Profile
Ultimate Rugby Profile
Its Rugby Profile

1990 births
Living people
Bristol Bears players
English rugby union players
Rugby union players from London
Wasps RFC players
Rugby union scrum-halves